Karl Story (born 1967) is an American comic book artist specializing in inking. He is one of the original members of Atlanta's Gaijin Studios.

Over a career of almost two decades, he has worked on books such as Nightwing, Batman, Star Trek: Debt of Honor, Aliens versus Predator, X-Men, Wildstorm Summer Special, Terra Obscura, Tom Strong, Ocean, The American Way, and Midnighter, as well as many others.

External links
 

American comics artists
1967 births
Living people
Comics inkers